Bucculatrix notella is a moth in the family Bucculatricidae. It was described by Svetlana Seksjaeva in 1996. It is found in Japan (Hokkaido, Honshu, Kyushu) and the Russian Far East.

The wingspan is 6–7 mm. The forewings are white, with chocolate brown or pale ocherous streaks and patches. The hindwings are whitish grey.

The larvae feed on Artemisia princeps. They mine the leaves of their host plant. The young larvae form a linear mine. Older larvae leave this first mine and enter the leaf through circular holes, mining out the leaf tissue. Pupation takes place in a white cocoon.

References

Natural History Museum Lepidoptera generic names catalog

Bucculatricidae
Moths described in 1996
Moths of Asia
Moths of Japan